Lithium cobalt oxide, sometimes called lithium cobaltate or lithium cobaltite, is a chemical compound with formula . The cobalt atoms are formally in the +3 oxidation state, hence the IUPAC name lithium cobalt(III) oxide. 

Lithium cobalt oxide is a dark blue or bluish-gray crystalline solid, and is commonly used in the positive electrodes of lithium-ion batteries.

Structure

The structure of  has been studied with numerous techniques including x-ray diffraction, electron microscopy, neutron powder diffraction, and EXAFS.

The solid consists of layers of monovalent lithium cations that lie between extended anionic sheets of cobalt and oxygen atoms, arranged as edge-sharing octahedra, with two faces parallel to the sheet plane. The cobalt atoms are formally in the trivalent oxidation state and are sandwiched between two layers of oxygen atoms.  

In each layer (cobalt, oxygen, or lithium), the atoms are arranged in a regular triangular lattice. The lattices are offset so that the lithium atoms are farthest from the cobalt atoms, and the structure repeats in the direction perpendicular to the planes every three cobalt (or lithium) layers. The threefold rotational axis (which is normal to the layers) is termed improper because the triangles of oxygen (being on opposite sides of each octahedron) are anti-aligned.

Preparation
Fully reduced lithium cobalt oxide can be prepared by heating a stoichiometric mixture of lithium carbonate  and cobalt(II,III) oxide  or metallic cobalt at 600–800 °C, then annealing the product at 900 °C for many hours, all under an oxygen atmosphere.

Nanometer-size particles more suitable for cathode use can also be obtained by calcination of hydrated cobalt oxalate β-·2, in the form of rod-like crystals about 8 μm long and 0.4 μm wide, with lithium hydroxide , up to 750–900 °C.

A third method uses lithium acetate, cobalt acetate, and citric acid in equal molar amounts, in water solution. Heating at 80 °C turns the mixture into a viscous transparent gel. The dried gel is then ground and heated gradually to 550 °C.

Use in rechargeable batteries
The usefulness of lithium cobalt oxide as an intercalation electrode was discovered in 1980 by an Oxford University research group led by John B. Goodenough and Tokyo University's Koichi Mizushima.

The compound is now used as the cathode in some rechargeable lithium-ion batteries, with particle sizes ranging from nanometers to micrometers. During charging, the cobalt is partially oxidized to the +4 state, with some lithium ions moving to the electrolyte, resulting in a range of compounds  with 0 < x < 1.  

Batteries produced with  cathodes have very stable capacities, but have lower capacities and power than those with cathodes based on nickel-cobalt-aluminum (NCA) oxides. Issues with thermal stability are better for  cathodes than other nickel-rich chemistries although not significantly. This makes  batteries susceptible to thermal runaway in cases of abuse such as high temperature operation (>130 °C) or overcharging. At elevated temperatures,  decomposition generates oxygen, which then reacts with the organic electrolyte of the cell. This is a safety concern due to the magnitude of this highly exothermic reaction, which can spread to adjacent cells or ignite nearby combustible material. In general, this is seen for many lithium ion battery cathodes.

See also
 List of battery types
 Sodium cobalt oxide

References

External links
Imaging the Structure of Lithium Cobalt Oxide at Atomic Level  from the Lawrence Berkeley National Laboratory 

Cobalt(III) compounds
Lithium compounds
Oxides